Stethoperma candezei is a species of beetle in the family Cerambycidae. It was described by Lameere in 1884. It is known from Brazil.

References

Onciderini
Beetles described in 1884